Democratic Left Movement (in Spanish: Movimiento Democrático de Izquierda or MDI), was a political alliance in Peru founded in 1992 by small group that had left Socialist Political Action (APS), Movement of Socialist Affirmation (MAS), Revolutionary Mariateguist Party (PMR) and Revolutionary Communist Party (PCR).

MDI contested the general elections 1992 and municipal elections 1993. Later it dissolved.
1992 establishments in Peru
Defunct left-wing political party alliances
Defunct political party alliances in Peru
Political parties established in 1992
Socialist parties in Peru
Peru